Bashettihalli, is a suburb of Doddaballapura in the state of Karnataka, originally envisaged as an industrial town of Doddaballapur city The latitude 12.9779204 and longitude 77.5687766 are the geocoordinate of the Bashettihalli. There is a similar-sounding village Bashattihalli in Sidlaghatta taluk.

Modern Bashettihalli
It was a Grama Panchayat. State Highway 9 (Bangalore - Hindupur)  passes through Bashettihalli

Schools 
 Jawahar Navodaya Vidyalaya
 Govt High School
 Nikhila Lower Primary School
 Govt Higher Primary School
 St. Pauls Public School

Banks 
 State bank of India. Bashettihalli Industrial Estate Branch
 State bank of India. Apparel Park Branch
 State bank of Mysore. Bashettihalli Branch
 Indian Overseas Bank. Bashettihalli Branch
 Bashettihalli Vyavasaya Seva Sahakara Sanga.

Location

References

Doddaballapura Taluk